The dark-shouldered snake eel (Ophichthus cephalozona, also known commonly as the headsaddle snake eel, the black-neck snake eel, the blacksaddle snake eel, or the one-banded snake-eel) is an eel in the family Ophichthidae (worm/snake eels). It was described by Pieter Bleeker in 1864. It is a tropical, marine eel which is known from the Pacific Ocean, including the East Indies, the Society Islands, the Mariana Islands, Queensland, the Marshall Islands, Micronesia, Japan, and India. It dwells at a depth range of 2–15 metres, and inhabits reefs. It forms burrows in mud and sand, and forages during the night. Males can reach a maximum total length of 115 centimetres.

The dark-shouldered snake eel is of no commercial interest to fisheries, but is sometimes caught in nets in the Ryukyu Islands.

References

External links
 
 

Ophichthus
Taxa named by Pieter Bleeker
Fish described in 1864